Yonder may refer to:

Businesses
 Yonder (company), an "information integrity" company based in Austin, TX, and formerly known as New Knowledge

Entertainment
 Yonder (collection), a 1958 collection of short stories by Charles Beaumont
 Tin Star Orphans, a Canadian indie rock band previously known as Yonder
 Yonder Mountain String Band, an American progressive bluegrass group from Nederland, Colorado
 Yonder: The Cloud Catcher Chronicles, a 2017 video game
 Yonder, a young readers imprint of Restless Books
 Yonder (TV series), a 2022 South Korean television series

People
 Yonder Alonso (born 1987), Cuban professional baseball player
 Yonder Godoy (born 1993), Venezuelan racing cyclist
 Yonder García (born 1993), Cuban volleyball player

See also
 Locative adverb
 Yonder Bognie, stone circle in Aberdeenshire, Scotland
 Yondertown, a mining hamlet
 Yondering, a 1980 collection of short stories by Louis L'Amour
 Yonderboi (born 1980), Hungarian composer, music producer and visual artist